Ringhals may refer to:

Rinkhals, a venomous species of snake with the ability to spit venom.
Ringhals Nuclear Power Plant, a Swedish nuclear power plant.